Parsa Pirouzfar (born 13 September 1972) is an Iranian actor, theatre director, painter, playwright and translator. He is best known for his acting in In the Eyes of the Wind (2009–2010) and Mum's Guest (2004). He has received various accolades, including an Iran Cinema Celebration Award, in addition to nominations for a Crystal Simorgh and a Hafez Award.

Early life
Parsa Pirouzfar was born on 13 September 1972 in Tehran, Iran. He is an actor; theatre director, acting instructor, playwright, painter, and translator. From 1984 to 1990, when he was in high school, he created his first comic strips. According to the information holds on his official website, these comic stories never has been published. Having graduated from high school with Math and Physics major in 1990, he started his academic studies in painting at the Faculty of Fine Arts of the University of Tehran in 1991. Where, in the same year, he also started acting on stage in different university plays. Parsa Pirouzfar also worked as a voice-over actor from 1993 to 1997. His first film role came at the age of 22 in 1994, playing a brief part in Dariush Mehrjui's Pari. In the same year, he studied “Stanislavsky's acting method” under acting instructor Mahin Oskouei, the Iranian theater director and instructor and Iran's pioneering female theatre arts figure. In 1995, he continued his studies in acting at Samandarian Institute of Dramatic Arts under renowned Iranian film and theatre director, translator, and acting instructor Hamid Samandarian. His stage debut was in the same year. He performed in Les Misérables directed by Behrouz Gharibpour, Iranian theatre director and pioneer of traditional Persian puppet theatre, and played as Marius Pontmercy; however, he became involved in theatre while he was studying painting at the University of Tehran and even before playing Marius. Having graduated with a bachelor's degree from Tehran University's Faculty of Fine Arts in painting in 1997, he performed in The Lady Aoi by Yukio Mishima, directed by Bahram Beyzaie, and played the role of Hikaru. This was his second official appearance on the stage of the theatre. Parsa Pirouzfar officially started working on his own personal projects for the stage in 2001, and he made his directional debut in theatre with 'Art', a play by Yasmina Reza. He gave acting courses as a theatre instructor at Karnameh Institute of Arts and Culture as well as in extracurricular acting classes at Allameh Tabatabaie University in 2004 and 2005 and also at Hilaj Film School in 2007, 2010, and 2011. Since graduation from high school, Parsa Pirouzfar has also been involved periodically in sculpture, graphic design, and making teasers. Parsa Pirouzfar is a founder member of Iranian Theatre Actors Association, member of Khaneh Cinema (Iranian Alliance of Motion Picture Guilds), ⁣ member of Iranian Film Actors Association (I.F.A.A.) and The Theatre Forum.

Career

Matryoshka (play)

In 2015 Parsa Pirouzfar directed the play Matryoshka, a Persian-language satire based on selected short stories of Anton Chekhov, translated, written, and directed by Parsa Pirouzfar. Matryoshka first premiered on 13 September 2015 at Theatre West, as a solo performance, in Los Angeles. The play has over 30 characters all performed by the playwright and theatre director Parsa Pirouzfar in its theatrical production. Matryoshka subsequently ran for two years in the US cities of Los Angeles, San Diego, and Berkeley as well as Toronto, Vancouver, and Montreal in Canada in 2015 and 2016; and finally, after multiple performances due to its immense popularity, finished its staging in Tehran in Iran in 2017.

Matryoshka was particularly important to Parsa Pirouzfar's career. His unique performance playing over 30 characters of the play all by himself was stunningly iconic. Matryoshka earned him the Golden Statue Award for Best Actor in the 35th Celebration of the annual Fajr International Theatre Festival in Tehran, Iran in 2017.

Member of jury

 9th Iranian Film Festival, Australia (IFFA), 2020
Theatre Forum, ⁣ 2010-2011
 14th Celebration of 'Khaneh Cinema (The Iranian Alliance of Motion Picture Guilds)', 2010
 10th Celebration of 'Khaneh Cinema (The Iranian Alliance of Motion Picture Guilds)', 2001
 9th Celebration of 'Khaneh Cinema (The Iranian Alliance of Motion Picture Guilds)', 2000

Association memberships

 Iranian Theatre Actors Association, founder member
 Khaneh Cinema (The Iranian Alliance of Motion Picture Guilds)
 Iranian Film Actors Association (I.F.A.A.)
 Iranian Theatre Actors Association
 Theatre Forum

Teaching and instructing

 Freelance Workshops and Acting Classes
 Hilaj Film School, 2007, 2010 & 2011
 Extracurricular Acting Classes of Allameh Tabatabaie University, 2004–2005
 Karnameh Institute of Arts and Culture, 2004–2005

Filmography

Film

Web

Television

Theatre

Awards and nominations

References

External links

1972 births
Dramaturges
Iranian dramatists and playwrights
20th-century dramatists and playwrights
21st-century dramatists and playwrights
Iranian theatre directors
Iranian translators
Living people
People from Tehran
Postmodern writers
Academic staff of the University of Tehran
Modernist theatre
Method actors
Mime